Khalid Ahmed Qasim is a Yemeni citizen who has been held in extrajudicial detention in the United States Guantanamo Bay detention camp in Cuba, since May 2002.

Official status reviews

Originally the Bush Presidency asserted that captives apprehended in the "war on terror" were not covered by the Geneva Conventions, and could be held indefinitely, without charge, and without an open and transparent review of the justifications for their detention.
In 2004 the United States Supreme Court ruled, in Rasul v. Bush, that Guantanamo captives were entitled to being informed of the allegations justifying their detention, and were entitled to try to refute them.

Office for the Administrative Review of Detained Enemy Combatants

Following the Supreme Court's ruling the Department of Defense set up the Office for the Administrative Review of Detained Enemy Combatants.

Scholars at the Brookings Institution, led by Benjamin Wittes, listed the captives still held in Guantanamo in December 2008, according to whether their detention was justified by certain common allegations:
 Khalid Qasim was listed as one of the captives who the military alleges were members of either al Qaeda or the Taliban and associated with the other group.
 Khalid Qasim was listed as one of the captives who "The military alleges ... traveled to Afghanistan for jihad."
 Khalid Qasim was listed as one of the captives who "The military alleges that the following detainees stayed in Al Qaeda, Taliban or other guest- or safehouses."
 Khalid Qasim was listed as one of the captives who "The military alleges ... took military or terrorist training in Afghanistan."
 Khalid Qasim was listed as one of the captives who "The military alleges ... fought for the Taliban."
 Khalid Qasim was listed as one of the captives who "The military alleges ... were at Tora Bora."
 Khalid Qasim was listed as one of the captives whose "names or aliases were found on material seized in raids on Al Qaeda safehouses and facilities."
 Khalid Qasim was listed as one of the captives who was a foreign fighter.
 Khalid Qasim was listed as one of the captives who "deny affiliation with Al Qaeda or the Taliban yet admit facts that, under the broad authority the laws of war give armed parties to detain the enemy, offer the government ample legal justification for its detention decisions."
 Khalid Qasim was listed as one of the captives who had admitted "some form of associational conduct."

Khalid Qasim's CSRT dossier, containing close to a dozen documents, was one of the first 58 the Associated Press acquired through a Freedom of Information Act request, in 2005.  The Associated Press subsequently made those dossiers available for download, a year before US District Court Judge Jed Rakoff ordered the DoD to make the names of the Guantanamo captives public.

During his 2004 Combatant Status Review Tribunal, his Personal Representative reported that Qasim had told him he had been tortured in Afghanistan by his Afghan captors. He said his Afghan captors threatened to retaliate against him if he deviated from the story they told him to tell the Americans.

Initially he said he had told the Americans the story his Afghan captors had coached him to tell. He said he had stopped talking to his American interrogators when they started torturing him too.

He acknowledged coming from Yemen. He denied being trained at Al Farouq or any other camp. He said he spent all his time in Afghanistan living in a guesthouse, and had never been near the front lines. He denied ever being approached by the Taliban, and that if he had he would not have been able to understand them because he does not speak their language.

He said it was his brother who was apprehended for a role in the bombing of the Cole, but that he had nothing to do with the attack.

He denied ever participating in hostilities.

He acknowledged being present in Tora Bora, but claimed he did not know the people there were al Qaida.

He acknowledged that he had been addressed by Osama bin Laden – but it was merely a passing greeting.

When asked why he had spent so long in Afghanistan he said he was fleeing violence and mistreatment from Indian authorities.  He said he was planning to go home, when the Cole was attacked. The attack threw suspicion on anyone returning from Afghanistan. Things were calming down, and he was starting to think it might be safe, when al Qaeda attacked the World Trade Center.

The Tribunal reconvened to give the Personal Representative an opportunity to amend what he has said before. On second thought, he realized that the detainee had not said he was tortured by Americans. He said he heard other detainees crying at night.

He also amended his earlier account, and said that Qasim had not said he was tortured in Afghanistan, only that he had been mistreated.

The Tribunal reconvened a second time, to ask for clarification on the torture question, because the detainee's statement did say he was tortured. During the final convening of Qasim's Tribunal, his Personal Representative said that Qasim had claimed torture, and had only changed his story when the Personal Representative went back to clarify the details following the first meeting of his Tribunal.

Habeas appeal

Formerly secret Joint Task Force Guantanamo assessment

On April 25, 2011, whistleblower organization WikiLeaks published formerly secret assessments drafted by Joint Task Force Guantanamo analysts.
His 13-page Joint Task Force Guantanamo assessment was drafted on April 7, 2008.
It was signed by camp commandant Rear Admiral Mark H. Buzby.
He recommended continued detention.

Conversation with Arun Rath

In January 2017, National Public Radio reporter Arun Rath produced an episode for the PBS network series Frontline about Mansur al-Dayfi, who was transferred to Serbia in July 2016.  During a follow-up visit to Guantanamo, in a lapse from the JTF-GTMO rules, he allowed Khalid Qasim to have a conversation with him.  Although Rath was forced to shut off his recording devices he recounted for his documentary some of the details of the conversation that followed. When he texted al-Dayfi to tell him of the conversation al-Dayfi identified Qasim as his best friend, and was too overcome by emotion to continue.

Qasim said he had had four reviews, and feared he would be held in Guantanamo forever.

Op-ed published in the Guardian, on October 13, 2017

On October 13, 2017, The Guardian published an op-ed that Qasim dictated to one of his lawyers, detailing a change in Guantanamo's medical practices.  Up until September 20, 2017, it was medical policy to force-feed Guantanamo hunger-strikers when their weight fell dangerously low. However, according to Qasim, on that date, the camp's senior medical officer addressed the remaining hunger strikers, including Qasim, telling them that they would no longer be force-fed.

Military spokesmen denied that there had been a policy change.  They asserted it was still official policy to start force-feeding, to prevent individuals dying. They suggested that the camp's medical authorities were merely changing the danger threshold where they would begin force-feeding.

Art
In 2017, Qasim created a painting called Titanic while detained at Guantanamo Bay. The artwork was one of seven works created by inmates and it was displayed at John Jay College, New York in the autumn of 2017.

References

Yemeni extrajudicial prisoners of the United States
Detainees of the Guantanamo Bay detention camp
Living people
1977 births